Anders Ingvar Kjell Kjellson (20 May 1923 – 18 December 2014) was a Swedish stage and film actor. Kjellson was born in Kärna, Östergötland County. He was accepted at Dramatens elevskola in 1946. He worked as an actor at various theatres, and was part of the permanent ensemble at the Royal Dramatic Theatre from 1964. He had notable roles in a number of plays including Hedda Gabler, The Wild Duck, The Beggars' Opera and Twelfth Night. In 2013, he played the old servant Firs in The Cherry Orchard at Stockholm City Theatre.

He also worked in films including Zorn, Raskenstam, and Jazzgossen.

Kjellson won the Eugene O'Neill Award in 1978. He died at the age of 91 on 18 December 2014 of pneumonia. He was married to actress Meta Velander until his death.

Selected filmography

 Tre söner gick till flyget (1945) - Young Man Playing Piano (uncredited)
 Blåjackor (1945) - Aspirant Strid (uncredited)
 The Bells of the Old Town (1946) - Guest at the Party at 'Bristol' (uncredited)
 In the Arms of the Sea (1951) - Third Mate
 Dance in the Smoke (1954) - Snål-Jampe
Taxi 13 (1954) - Artist
 Seger i mörker (1954) - Engineer Borg
 Karin Månsdotter (1954) - Hakon Ladugårdsfogde - Guard at Gripsholm Castle (uncredited)
 The Yellow Squadron (1954) - Minor Role (uncredited)
 Mord, lilla vän (1955) - Erik Ljungdahl
 The Girl in the Rain (1955) - Klas
 The Staffan Stolle Story (1956) - Rabites, ökenskurk
 Swing it, fröken (1956) - Robert Roos
 Den långa julmiddagen (1956) - Charles
 The Song of the Scarlet Flower (1956) - Falk
 Summer Place Wanted (1957) - Radio Theatre (voice, uncredited)
 The Minister of Uddarbo (1957) - Doctor
 The Jazz Boy (1958) - Partygäst
 Swinging at the Castle (1959) - Vicar (uncredited)
 Pärlemor (1961) - Pawnbroker
 En nolla för mycket (1962) - Fredrik
 Kort är sommaren (1962) - The Count
 Hide and Seek (1963) - Prison Governor
 Wild West Story (1964) - Judge
 Heja Roland! (1966) - Skog
 The Girls (1968) - Olle
 Black Palm Trees (1968) - Consul
 Shame (1968) - Oswald, lärare i förhörslokalen
 Het snö (1968) - Police Inspector Nordström
 Made in Sweden (1969) - Niklas Hedström
 The Bookseller Gave Up Bathing (1969) - Elim Svensson
 Grisjakten (1970) - Gustav Rosen
 Ministern (1970) - Driver
 Vita Nejlikan (1974) - James
 Måndagarna med Fanny (1977) - Hilding Eriksson
 Chez Nous (1978) - Elmgren
 Marmalade Revolution (1980) - Editor
 Sverige åt svenskarna (1980) - Sir John
 The Flight of the Eagle (1982) - Alfred Nobel
 Raskenstam (1983) - Ludvig af Tidaholm
 Samson og Sally (1984) - (voice)
 Svindlande affärer (1985) - Arvidsson
 Gösta Berlings saga (1986, TV Mini-Series) - Sintram
 The Journey to Melonia (1989) - Captain Christmas tree (voice)
 Den ofrivillige golfaren (1991) - Rutger
 Zorn (1994) - Minister Åkerman
 Pettson och Findus – Kattonauten (2000) - Kungen (voice)
 The Last Sentence (2012) - Pehr Eklund (final film role)

References

External links

Ingvar Kjellson , at Dramaten

1923 births
2014 deaths
People from Linköping Municipality
Swedish male stage actors
Swedish male film actors
Eugene O'Neill Award winners
Litteris et Artibus recipients
20th-century Swedish male actors
Deaths from pneumonia in Sweden